SA3 couplers (also known as СА3 or СА-3 couplers per the typical foundry stamp on top of these couplers, meaning "Советская Автосцепка, 3" in Russian or "Soviet Auto-latch 3" in English) or Willison coupler and Russian coupler are railway couplings used primarily in Russia and states influenced or not influenced by the former Soviet Union, such as Finland, Iran, Poland and Mongolia.

Russian railways originally used buffers and chain couplers during Imperial era, however these had several disadvantages: their draft load was limited, they were susceptible to buffer lock, and they were not semiautomatic like the North American Janney couplers. Conversion to Janney couplers (as Japan and Australia had) was considered, as was development of a new design. The Willison coupler was patented in 1916 by John Willison from Derby, England. The Knorr-Bremse company bought it and it started to be used in Germany for some heavy trains and some suburban trains in Paris. In the 1930s, the Soviets improved on this design and then decided to make this coupler standard across the Russian railway system.

Experimentation 
In the late 1920s, the UIC had established a working group for the replacement of the chain link coupler, which restricts the efficiency of freight railroads in a major way. Many railroads ran prototypes. In Germany, coal trains with Scharfenberg couplers yielded unfavourable results in winter weather, other railroads did similar tests. But the UIC was not able to agree on one replacement. This failure of the UIC, which hampers freight operation in Europe even today, led to the decision by the Soviet Union to move forward without a standard being achieved in the talks.

The coupler was developed in (1932) and named SA3 (abbreviation of Russian , Soviet Automatic-Coupler 3rd Variant) and was an improved version of the Willison coupler, with better design of lock parts and mechanics. Conversion of rolling stock began in 1935. The Second World War delayed the introduction, so that the conversion was completed only 1957.

Operation 
Helper locomotives at the end of the train are rarely used in the countries of the former Soviet Union. The load of the freight per train is not as heavy as on American railways.

Although the SA3 coupler is primarily used in the countries of the former Soviet Union, they are visible every day at the transshipping stations, at the eastern borders of the European Union (Poland, Slovakia and Hungary). Since bogie exchange technology has progressed, this allows for cars with SA3 couplers to regularly operate on the standard gauge tracks. A special converter car is inserted between standard and Russian gauge cars for this operation, with different couplers (SA3 and standard) on either end. Although these coupling freight cars have room for cargo, they are always operated empty.

If the vehicle fitted with the SA3 retains its buffers, then a special adapter allows that vehicle to couple to another vehicle fitted with buffers and chain, provided that the buffers have the same spacing or gauge. This appears to be done in Iran.

On the Uzhhorod–Košice broad-gauge track between Košice and Uzhhorod, Ukraine, of which the major part is on Slovakian territory, SA3 couplings are used exclusively. The railway is used for ore and coal transports from Kryvyi Rih, Ukraine to the US Steel mill in Košice and coal to the power plant of Vojany.

In addition, the heavy iron ore trains on the Swedish Malmbanan began to use SA3 couplings in 1969 after problems with snapping chain couplers and a need for ever increasing capacity with higher train weights. They tried out Janney couplers, too, when moving beyond 8,000 tons because SA3 hasn't seen much use at such loads before that: in the Soviet Union, freight trains rarely exceeded 6,000 tons. The earlier SJ Dm3 locomotives have buffers fitted; therefore, they can couple with rolling stock fitted with buffers and chain.

The longest and heaviest train with SA3 couplings ran on 20 February 1986 from Ekibastuz to the Urals, Soviet Union.

Heaviest regular load 
The heaviest load for the SA3 in Ukraine is 12,000 tonnes.

Future 
The new European Automatic Center Coupler (C-AKv) has been based on this coupler, with the extended features of automatic brake and electric couplings. It also has vertical stability added, so that the coupling cannot fall down and damage the tracks or cause a derailment. It is compatible with the standard SA3 coupler and will have buffers needed for use with the standard buffers and chain couplers under the long transition period. The electric plugs would be most useful with electronically controlled pneumatic brakes.

Usage 

The former Soviet Union:

 , Armenian Railways
 , Azerbaijan Railways
 , Belarusian Railway
 , Eesti Raudtee
 , Georgian Railways
 , Kazakhstan Temir Zholy
 , Kyrgyz Railways
 , Latvian Railways
 , Lithuanian Railways
 , Calea Ferată din Moldova
 , Russian Railways
 , Türkmendemirýollary
 , Rail transport in Tajikistan
 , Ukrainian Railways
 , Uzbek Railways

Other countries with extensive usage 

 , Camrail
 , Rail transport in Finland
 , Trans-Gabon Railway (called Willison coupler) 
 , Rail transport in Iran
 , Iraqi Republic Railways
  Mauritania Railway operated by Société Nationale Industrielle et Minière
 , Rail transport in Mongolia
 , Rail transport in Turkey

Some usage 

 ; Miniature Willison used on some sugarcane tramways and underground colliery railways.
 ; Koninklijke Hoogovens (Tata Steel Europe): used on railways within the steel plant complex.
  (Broad Gauge Metallurgy Line); The longest broad gauge railway line in Poland. It is used only for freight traffic, mainly iron ore and coal.
  (Uzhhorod–Košice broad-gauge track); Heavy iron-ore transports from Ukraine.
 ; Willison Coupler used in mining and tunneling railroads.

See also 

 C-AKv coupler
 Draft gear
 Gangway connection
 Intermat coupler
 Longest trains of 
 Railway coupling by country
 Unicoupler/Intermat
 Unilink coupler

References

External 
 Adapter piece between SA3 coupler and Janney coupler

Soviet inventions
Couplers